Puka Qaqa (Quechua puka red, qaqa rock, "red rock", hispanicized spelling Pucaccacca) is a mountain in the Andes of Peru, about  high. It is located in the Lima Region, Cajatambo Province, Cajatambo District. Puka Qaqa lies south of the Waywash mountain range, northwest of Yana Hirka and south of a mountain named Muntiqucha.

References

Mountains of Peru
Mountains of Lima Region